Linwood Borough School No. 1, also known as the Leedsville Schoolhouse, is a former one-room schoolhouse built in 1873 and located at 16 West Poplar Avenue in the city of Linwood in Atlantic County, New Jersey. It was added to the National Register of Historic Places on December 20, 1984 for its significance in architecture and education. The Linwood Historical Society now uses the building as a museum.

History
The community was known as Leedsville until 1880. The first school was built , a log Quaker Meeting House. The second was built 1843 and known as the Leeds Ville Academy. The third and current building was built in 1873. It was used as an elementary school from 1873 to 1908. It later served as the Linwood municipal hall until 1965, when it was converted for use as the city library.

See also
 National Register of Historic Places listings in Atlantic County, New Jersey
 List of museums in New Jersey

References

External links
 

Linwood, New Jersey
One-room schoolhouses in New Jersey		
National Register of Historic Places in Atlantic County, New Jersey
School buildings on the National Register of Historic Places in New Jersey
New Jersey Register of Historic Places
School buildings completed in 1873
1873 establishments in New Jersey
Museums in Atlantic County, New Jersey
Victorian architecture in New Jersey